Oh Beom-Seok (born 29 July 1984) is a South Korean former professional footballer who played as a right back.

He played at the 2003 FIFA World Youth Championship in the United Arab Emirates and played in all matches as South Korea advanced to the round of 16. He also played for South Korea at the 2007 AFC Asian Cup.

In 2008, he signed for Russian side Krylia Sovetov, becoming teammates with Choe Myong-Ho of North Korea. Oh left Krylia Sovetov in August 2009 after the club did not pay his salary regularly. Known for his rough style of play, he is nicknamed "The King of Fouls".

Career statistics

Club

International

International goals

Honours 
 Entertainment

Notes

References

External links

 
 National Team Player Record 
 Russian Premier League Player Profile 
 
 
 
 

1984 births
Living people
People from Pohang
Association football midfielders
South Korean footballers
South Korean expatriate footballers
South Korea international footballers
2007 AFC Asian Cup players
2010 FIFA World Cup players
Pohang Steelers players
Yokohama FC players
PFC Krylia Sovetov Samara players
Ulsan Hyundai FC players
Suwon Samsung Bluewings players
Zhejiang Professional F.C. players
Ansan Mugunghwa FC players
Gangwon FC players
K League 1 players
K League 2 players
J1 League players
Russian Premier League players
Chinese Super League players
Expatriate footballers in Japan
Expatriate footballers in Russia
Expatriate footballers in China
South Korean expatriate sportspeople in Japan
South Korean expatriate sportspeople in Russia
South Korean expatriate sportspeople in China
Footballers at the 2006 Asian Games
Asian Games competitors for South Korea
Sportspeople from North Gyeongsang Province